Class Comics is an independent comic books publisher, founded in 1995 by Patrick Fillion as Class Enterprises, which specializes in gay erotic comics. Class Comics Inc. is now run by Fillion and his partner Fraser in Vancouver, British Columbia.  Fillion has written and illustrated the largest share of Class Comics current catalogue.

Its titles include: Guardians of the Cube, Satisfaction Guaranteed, Camili-Cat, Naked Justice, Rapture, Deimos, Porky, "Rainbow Country" and The Pornomicon. Artists published by the company include French Logan and Max, and Spanish Ismael Alvarez. In 2015, Class began distributing digital editions of Dale Lazarov's Sticky Graphic Novels imprint.

Class Comics has introduced their comic and art book collections to the German and French audience through European publishers Bruno Gmünder and H & O Editions. The company publishes digital editions of some titles through MiKandi.

Titles

References

External links
 
 PatrickFillion.com
 

Comic book publishing companies of Canada
Publishing companies established in 1995
Gay male pornographic comics